Prnalija is a village in the municipality of Karbinci, North Macedonia.

Demographics
As of the 2021 census, Prnalija had 161 residents with the following ethnic composition:
Turks 149
Persons for whom data are taken from administrative sources 12

According to the 2002 census, the village had a total of 197 inhabitants. Ethnic groups in the village include:
Turks 197

References

Villages in Karbinci Municipality
Turkish communities in North Macedonia